Love Me Sailor is a 1945 novel from Australian author Robert Close.

Plot
A woman travels on a ship from Chile to the US.

Background
Close finished writing the book in 1943.

Adaptations
The book was to have been adapted into a radio play in 1946 but the production was cancelled at the last minute.

Obscenity Trial
In 1946 Close and "Georgian House Pty Ltd", the publisher of the novel were prosecuted in the Supreme Court of Victoria for "obscene libel".

During the first trial, the entire 90,000-word book was read to the jury by counsel for the prosecution twice: the first jury was discharged when the court was notified that the foreman of the jury had discussed the case with one of Close's friends. Close was sentenced to three months' imprisonment and a fine of £100. This was later overturned on appeal; he served 10 days in prison and was fined £150.

References

1945 Australian novels
Novels set on ships